Rievaldo Doorson (born 21 April 2000) is a Surinamese footballer who plays as a forward for Inter Moengotapoe and the Suriname national team.

International career
In 2017, Doorson represented Suriname at the 2017 CONCACAF U-17 Championship, playing 90 minutes against Cuba and Costa Rica. In 2018, he played for the Surinamese U20 team at the 2018 CONCACAF U-20 Championship, making four appearances and scoring a brace against the U.S. Virgin Islands.

On 16 March 2019, Doorson made his senior debut for Suriname in a 3–1 friendly victory over Guyana.

References

External links

2000 births
Living people
Association football forwards
Surinamese footballers
People from Coronie District
S.V. Transvaal players
Inter Moengotapoe players
SVB Eerste Divisie players
Suriname youth international footballers
Suriname under-20 international footballers
Suriname international footballers